Finching may refer to

Finching (cattle), a colour pattern of cattle
Finching, English translation of vinkensport, a sport in which male Chaffinches sing competitively